was a Japanese football player. He played for Japan national team.

Club career
After graduating from Mikage Higher Normal School, Fujiwara played for Osaka SC many Japan national team players Kiyoo Kanda, Shiro Azumi, Fukusaburo Harada, Usaburo Hidaka, Toshio Hirabayashi, Setsu Sawagata, Kikuzo Kisaka and Shumpei Inoue were playing in those days.

National team career
In May 1923, Fujiwara was selected Japan national team for 1923 Far Eastern Championship Games in Osaka. At this competition, on May 23, he debuted against Philippines. But Japan lost this match (1-2). This match is Japan team first match in International A Match.

National team statistics

References

External links
 
 Japan National Football Team Database

Year of birth missing
Year of death missing
Place of birth missing
Place of death missing
Kobe University alumni
Japanese footballers
Japan international footballers
Association football forwards